Reiner Heugabel (born 5 February 1963) is a German wrestler. He competed at the 1984 Summer Olympics, the 1988 Summer Olympics and the 1992 Summer Olympics.

References

External links
 

1963 births
Living people
German male sport wrestlers
Olympic wrestlers of West Germany
Olympic wrestlers of Germany
Wrestlers at the 1984 Summer Olympics
Wrestlers at the 1988 Summer Olympics
Wrestlers at the 1992 Summer Olympics
People from Mettmann (district)
Sportspeople from Düsseldorf (region)
20th-century German people